Andrey Harawtsow (born 2 April 1981) is a Belarusian professional football manager and former player. As of 2020, he manages for Lokomotiv Gomel.

Honours
Gomel
Belarusian Premier League champion: 2003
Belarusian Cup winner: 2001–02

External links

1981 births
Living people
Belarusian footballers
Association football defenders
FC Gomel players
FC SKVICH Minsk players
FC Vitebsk players
FC Granit Mikashevichi players
FC Khimik Svetlogorsk players
FC ZLiN Gomel players
FC Lokomotiv Gomel players
Belarusian football managers